Eunemorilla is a genus of flies in the family Tachinidae.

Species
Eunemorilla albifrons (Walker, 1836)
Eunemorilla alearis (Reinhard, 1944)
Eunemorilla comosa (Reinhard, 1944)
Eunemorilla effeta (Reinhard, 1955)
Eunemorilla emulatus (Reinhard, 1962)
Eunemorilla longicornis (Reinhard, 1944)
Eunemorilla paralis (Reinhard, 1944)
Eunemorilla peruviana Townsend, 1919

References

Diptera of North America
Diptera of South America
Exoristinae
Tachinidae genera
Taxa named by Charles Henry Tyler Townsend